Peplometus oyo is a species of jumping spider in the genus Peplometus that lives in Nigeria. It was first described in 2011 and placed in the genus Pachyballus but was transferred to Peplometus in 2020.

References

Salticidae
Endemic fauna of Nigeria
Spiders of Africa
Spiders described in 2011
Taxa named by Wanda Wesołowska